A list of films produced in South Korea in 2000:

External links
 2000 in South Korea
 2000 in South Korean music

 2000 at www.koreanfilm.org

2000
South Korean
Film